Juan Carlos Moreno Rojo (born 14 March 1985), commonly known as Carlitos, is a Spanish footballer who plays for CF Rayo Majadahonda as a midfielder.

Club career
Born in Cádiz, Andalusia, Carlitos finished his formation with Cádiz CF, and made his senior debuts with the reserves in the 2003–04 season. On 24 April 2004 he made his professional debut, playing the last ten minutes in a 2–2 Segunda División away draw against Ciudad de Murcia, and scored his first professional goal on 19 June by netting the second of a 2–1 home win over UD Almería.

In 2006 summer Carlitos was released by the Andalusians, and resumed his career in Tercera División, representing Xerez CD B, Chiclana CF and San Fernando CD. With the latter he achieved promotion to Segunda División B at the end of the 2011–12 season, appearing in 33 matches and scoring three goals.

On 1 July 2016, Carlitos joined CF Rayo Majadahonda in the third tier. A regular starter, he appeared in 33 matches and scored five goals during the 2017–18 campaign, as his side achieved promotion to the second division for the first time ever.

References

External links

Stats and bio at Cadistas1910 

1985 births
Living people
Footballers from Cádiz
Spanish footballers
Association football midfielders
Segunda División players
Segunda División B players
Tercera División players
Divisiones Regionales de Fútbol players
Cádiz CF B players
Cádiz CF players
Xerez CD B players
CF Rayo Majadahonda players